Southern Exposure may refer to:

Southern Exposure (album), a 2007 album released by FireHouse guitarist Bill Leverty
Southern Exposure (art space), a San Francisco non-profit art space
Southern Exposure (festival), a three-day event, held annually in Greenville, South Carolina
Southern Exposure (film), a 1934 short film, a musical parody of Uncle Tom's Cabin
Southern Exposure (magazine), a political and cultural magazine published by the Institute for Southern Studies
Southern exposure (terminology)
Southern Exposure Seed Exchange, a seed company specializing in heirloom varieties
Daffy's Southern Exposure, a 1942 short film